Corydalis aurea (scrambled eggs, golden smoke, golden corydalis) is a flowering plant in the poppy family (Papaveraceae), native to North America. A winter annual, it can be found in such areas as the sagebrush steppe.

The root is a branching caudex. Stems are decumbent, to 40 cm long, with blue-green leaves divided into leaflets with oval or diamond lobes.

The flowers are bilaterally symmetrical, yellow, 1 cm long, with a pouch-like spur at the bottom of the petals, borne in racemes of up to 30 flowers, each on a short stem. The flowers have four petals and six stamens.

The fruits are cylindrical capsules.

References

External links

Jepson Manual Treatment

Plants For A Future

aurea
Medicinal plants of North America